Arbiona Bajraktari (born 10 September 1996) is a Kosovan-born Albanian footballer who plays as a defender for KFF Vllaznia Shkodër and the Albania women's national team.

International goals

See also
List of Albania women's international footballers

References

External links 
 

1996 births
Living people
Albanian women's footballers
Women's association football defenders
KFF Vllaznia Shkodër players
Albania women's international footballers
People from Suva Reka
Kosovan women's footballers
Kosovan people of Albanian descent
Sportspeople of Albanian descent